Talheh (also Romanized as Ţalḩeh) is a village in Poshtkuh Rural District of Bushkan District, Dashtestan County, Bushehr province, Iran. At the 2006 census, its population was 2,387 in 532 households. The following census in 2011 counted 2,218 people in 572 households. The latest census in 2016 showed a population of 2,433 people in 696 households; it was the largest village in its rural district.

References 

Populated places in Dashtestan County